is a Japanese manufacturer of radio transmitting and receiving equipment, founded in 1954 by Tokuzo Inoue with the company's original name being "Inoue". Its products now include equipment for radio amateurs, pilots, maritime applications, land mobile professional applications and radio scanner enthusiasts.

Its headquarters are in Osaka, Japan, with branch offices in the United States (in Kirkland, Washington), Canada (in Delta, British Columbia), Australia (Melbourne, Victoria), New Zealand (Auckland), the United Kingdom (Kent, England), France (Toulouse), Germany (Bad Soden), Spain (Barcelona) and the People's Republic of China (Beijing).

Protocols

IDAS
IDAS is Icom's implementation of the NXDN protocol for two-way digital radio products intended for commercial Private Land Mobile Radio (PLMR) and low-end public safety communications systems. NXDN is a Common Air Interface (CAI) technical standard for mobile communications. It was developed jointly by Icom and Kenwood Corporation.

D-STAR

The D-STAR open radio system was developed by Icom based on digital radio protocols developed by the Japan Amateur Radio League and funded by the Ministry of Posts and Telecommunications.  This system is designed to provide advanced voice and data communications over amateur radio using open standards.

Products

Icom manufactures two way radios and receivers for use in marine applications, Airband, amateur radio applications, land mobile applications, and FRS / GMRS applications. Some radios made by ICOM are compatible with Motorola and SmarTrunk trunking systems.

See also

References

External links

Official global website 
Older Icom info   
Complete list of all amateur radio rigs produced by Icom

Electronics companies of Japan
Amateur radio companies
Manufacturing companies based in Osaka
Electronics companies established in 1954
Japanese brands
Japanese companies established in 1954
Companies listed on the Tokyo Stock Exchange
Radio manufacturers
Models of radios